Miha Dovžan (born 22 January 1994) is a Slovenian biathlete. He competed in the 2018 Winter Olympics.

Career results

World Championships

References

1994 births
Living people
Slovenian male biathletes
Biathletes at the 2018 Winter Olympics
Biathletes at the 2022 Winter Olympics
Olympic biathletes of Slovenia
Sportspeople from Jesenice, Jesenice
Biathletes at the 2012 Winter Youth Olympics
21st-century Slovenian people